Islam El-Shehaby ( ʾIslām ash-Shahābī; born 1 August 1982) is an Egyptian former judoka.

He competed at the 2008, 2012, and 2016 Summer Olympics. El Shehaby was a nine-time African Champion (2002–13), and was the world bronze medalist in 2010 in Tokyo. He won five World Cup medals, and competitions in Abu Dhabi, Düsseldorf, Moscow, Qingdao, Cairo and Baku. El Shehaby won silver at the 2016 Grand Prix Düsseldorf in the O100 classification.

Following controversy regarding his refusal to shake the hand of Israeli judoka Or Sasson, who defeated him at the 2016 Summer Olympics, he retired in August 2016. The Disciplinary Committee of the International Olympic Committee issued a "severe reprimand" to El Shehaby for behavior violating "the rules of fair play and against the spirit of friendship embodied in the Olympic Values," and he was sent home before the Olympics closing ceremony.

Personal life

Islam El Shehaby was born in Cairo, Egypt, and is a conservative Salafi Muslim. He is 1.95 m (6' 5") tall, and weighs 135 kg (298 lbs.)

2016 Olympics controversy 
El Shehaby competed at the 2016 Olympics in Rio de Janeiro, Brazil, where he was thrown twice by and lost to Israeli judoka Or Sasson, who later won a bronze medal in this competition. After the match, El Shehaby refused to bow or shake hands with his opponent, after the Israeli had bowed to him. As a result of his major breach of judo etiquette, the Egyptian was loudly booed and jeered by the near-capacity crowd.

After his defeat, El Shehaby lay flat on his back for a moment before standing to take his place before Sasson, in front of the referee. When Sasson extended his hand to the Egyptian, El Shehaby backed away, shaking his head and shunning Sasson. The referee then called El Shehaby back to the mat and demanded that he bow, at which point El Shehaby gave a quick nod of his head.

El Shehaby's conduct was widely condemned as unsportsmanlike. American coach Jimmy Pedro said "That is extremely rare in judo. It is especially disrespectful considering it was a clean throw and a fair match. It was completely dishonourable and totally unsportsmanlike on the part of the Egyptian." BBC judo commentator Mark Doran said. "That is not what the Olympics are about."

El Shehaby's refusal to shake hands had precedent, in actions by another member of Egypt's team. Egyptian judoka Ramadan Darwish had refused to shake hands with his Israeli opponent Arik Zeevi, another Israeli Olympic bronze medalist, in both the 2011 Judo Grand Slam and the 2012 Judo Grand Prix.

Prior to competing, El Shehaby had been urged to forfeit the match by Egyptian Islamists and nationalists, as Iranian Javad Mahjoub had done years earlier in forfeiting a match against Or Sasson. The Egyptian Olympic Committee stated that El Shehaby was alerted before the match to abide by all the rules and have sporting spirit. The committee also stated that what he did was a personal action.

Both the International Olympic Committee and the International Judo Federation stated that they would review the incident, to see if action should be taken. It is unclear what potential punishment El Shehaby or Egyptian judo as a whole could face, but his hopes of medaling were dashed regardless due to Sasson's decisive performance in the quarterfinals.

Following his defeat and the related controversy, El Shehaby announced he was retiring from judo.

The Ethics Committee and the Disciplinary Committee of the International Olympic Committee issued a "severe reprimand" to El Shehaby for behavior violating "the rules of fair play and against the spirit of friendship embodied in the Olympic Values", and he was reportedly sent home before the Olympics closing ceremony. IOC Disciplinary Committee also requested that the Egyptian Olympic Committee in the future make certain that all Egyptian athletes are properly educated as to the Olympic Values before they participate in the Olympic Games. Egypt's Judo Federation however denied that he had been punished and claimed he had traveled back home with his team as scheduled since it was customary for athletes to go back once their competitions were finished.

Achievements

See also
Boycotts of Israel in individual sports

References

External links

 
 
 

1982 births
Arab–Israeli conflict
Competitors at the 2005 Mediterranean Games
Competitors at the 2009 Mediterranean Games
Egyptian male judoka
Judoka at the 2004 Summer Olympics
Judoka at the 2008 Summer Olympics
Judoka at the 2012 Summer Olympics
Judoka at the 2016 Summer Olympics
Living people
Mediterranean Games bronze medalists for Egypt
Olympic Games controversies
Olympic judoka of Egypt
Sportspeople from Cairo
Egyptian Salafis
Mediterranean Games medalists in judo
African Games medalists in judo
Competitors at the 2011 All-Africa Games
African Games silver medalists for Egypt